Ulupano Junior Seuteni (born 9 December 1993 in Adelaide, Australia) is a rugby union footballer who plays as a Centre or Fullback or fly-half for the Stade Rochelais in Top 14.

Biography 
Seuteni was named in the  Extended Playing Squad for the 2012 Super Rugby season despite being only 17 years old and still in his final year at school. He missed the majority of the season through injury, however he retained his spot in the Reds EPS for the 2013 season.
He was a member of the Australia Under 20 side which competed in the 2012 IRB Junior World Championship in South Africa where he made 4 appearances and made 2 conversions.

Reference List

External links 
 

1993 births
Living people
Sportspeople from Adelaide
Australian sportspeople of Samoan descent
Australian rugby union players
Queensland Reds players
RC Toulonnais players
Rugby union fly-halves
Samoa international rugby union players